Charles H. Kelly (February 25, 1862–January 5, 1940) was an American Major League Baseball third baseman.

External links

1862 births
1940 deaths
Baseball players from Pennsylvania
Philadelphia Quakers players
Philadelphia Athletics (AA) players
Major League Baseball third basemen
Wilkes-Barre Coal Barons players
Wilkes-Barre (minor league baseball) players
Hazleton Pugilists players
19th-century baseball players